In molecular biology, the CAT RNA-binding domain (Co-AntiTerminator RNA-binding domain) is a protein domain found at the amino terminus of a family of transcriptional antiterminator proteins. This domain forms a dimer in the crystal structure. Transcriptional antiterminators of the BglG/SacY family are regulatory proteins that mediate the induction of sugar metabolizing operons in Gram-positive and Gram-negative bacteria. Upon activation, these proteins bind to specific targets in nascent mRNAs, thereby preventing abortive dissociation of the RNA polymerase from the DNA template.

References

Protein domains